The Vital Range is a subrange of the Hogem Ranges of the Omineca Mountains, bounded by Fall Creek, Silver Creek and Kenny Creek in northern British Columbia, Canada.

References

Vital Range in the Canadian Mountain Encyclopedia

Omineca Mountains